Love in a Puff is a 2010 Hong Kong romantic comedy directed by Pang Ho-cheung and starring Shawn Yue and Miriam Yeung.  The plot revolves around the love story of Cherie and Jimmy, two smokers who met at an outdoor smoking area subsequent to the ban of all indoor smoking areas in Hong Kong.  The film is classified as a category 3 film in Hong Kong.

Love in a Puff is one of the films which premiered in the 2010 Hong Kong International Film Festival.

A sequel, titled Love in the Buff was released on 29 March 2012 with the film being set in Beijing, China. Shawn Yue and Miriam Yeung reprised their roles. A third installment, Love Off the Cuff, was released on April 27, 2017.

Plot
Since 2007, the Hong Kong government banned smoking in all indoor areas, causing smokers from neighboring buildings to gather for cigarette breaks during office hours at trash bins with ashtrays near their work premises.  The regulars started sharing small talks and dirty jokes like friends at a hot pot dinner and this community became known as the "Hot Pot Pack".

Jimmy (Yue) is an advertising executive.  He meets and befriends Cherie (Yeung), a cosmetic sales girl, at a "Hot Pot Pack" shortly after Jimmy broke up with his girlfriend who cheated on him.  Over the next few days, Cherie  flirts with Jimmy during their cigarette breaks, and through text messages and excursions at night, this eventually leads to Cherie's break up with her live-in boyfriend.  On the night Cherie broke up with her boyfriend, they have a failed one night stand at a love motel.  Shortly afterwards, Cherie asks to change to the same telco provider as Jimmy in order to save on costs, but the nuance of this action causes Jimmy to have doubts about his commitment to their relationship.  Eventually, through a sequence of escalating conversations, Cherie forces them to confront the change in their relationship and consider whether they are viewing each other as love interests or just as companions during lonely nights.

Cast
 Miriam Yeung as Cherie, a cosmetics sales girl
 Shawn Yue as Jimmy, an advertising executive
 Cheung Tat Ming as Joseph, a hotel porter
 Miao Felin as a restaurant waitress
 Chui Tien-you as a 7-Eleven cashier
 Roy Szeto as Jimmy's colleague, an advertising executive and Patty's boyfriend
 Sharon Luk as Vivian, Jimmy's ex-girlfriend, an advertising executive
 Charmaine Fong as Patty, an advertising executive
 Yat Ning Chan as Isabel

Cameos
 Vincent Kuk as an advertising executive
 Jo Koo as Double K, Cherie's best friend
 Matt Chow as a Leisure and Cultural Services Department employee

Reception
Perry Lam of Muse gave a positive review, as he observes that ‘No other Hong Kong movies in recent memory give a more vivid sense of how Hong Kong people talk in real life.’ China Daily placed the film on their list of the best ten Chinese films of 2010.

Box office
Love in a Puff had a very poor opening weekend, mainly due to the  Category III rating.  However, the Category III rating was mostly due to the Cantonese profanity and heavy use of cigarettes in most scenes, and positive feedback on Facebook and various tweets resulted in a strong rebound, generating HK$5 million cumulative box office revenues after three weeks.

References

External links
 
 
 LoveHKfilm.com entry
 HK cinemagic entry

2010s Cantonese-language films
2010 films
Films directed by Pang Ho-cheung
2010 romantic comedy films
Hong Kong romantic comedy films
Smoking in Hong Kong
Films about smoking
Media Asia films
2010s Hong Kong films